Zhonghe District (Pe̍h-ōe-jī: Tiong-hô Khu), also spelled Chūwa and Jhonghe, is an inner city district in New Taipei City in northern Taiwan.

Geography and climate
Zhonghe lies just south-west of Taipei City and shares borders with Banqiao, Xindian, Tucheng and Yonghe Districts of New Taipei City, as well as Taipei City. Most of Zhonghe lies a few tens of meters above sea level and is heavily urbanized, with forested hillier country in the southeast. A mountainous ridge forms most of the eastern border with Xindian, which includes the highest point in Zhonghe, the 302-meter Fenglusai.

History
The present-day area of Zhonghe District was originally settled by aboriginal tribes. During conflict between the colonial forces of the Dutch and the Spanish, the area is recorded by the Dutch as Chiron, from the name of one of the tribes living there. This name is preserved in one of the constituent villages of the city, called Xiulang Li, and the bridge which connects Zhonghe and Xindian.

The area was subsequently settled by Han Chinese migrants from Fujian but remained relatively unimportant until the end of the Second World War.

Republic of China
In 1946, the population of the area of present-day Zhonghe and Yonghe was 30,000 and it was classified as a rural township. Due to rapid population growth Yonghe was separated from Zhonghe in 1958. Subsequently, on 1 January 1979, Zhonghe was upgraded to county-administered city status after reaching a population of 170,000. On 25 December 2010, due to the changing from Taipei County to New Taipei City, Zhonghe City was changed to Zhonghe District.

Administrative divisions

Zhonghe is divided into 93 villages, which are further subdivided into lín, of which there are 2,972 in total. Some administration is shared with neighbouring Yonghe District; due to both this and their proximity, they are sometimes collectively known as Shuanghe. This is also reflected in the names of various institutions such as Shuang-Ho Hospital in Zhonghe and Shuanghe Libai Church in Yonghe District.

Transportation

Rail
Zhonghe is served by the Zhonghe–Xinlu line and the Circular line of the Taipei Metro. three metro stations of the Zhonghe–Xinlu line are located in Zhonghe: Yongan Market, Jingan, and the terminal station, Nanshijiao. Jingan Station is an interchange station between the Circular and Zhonghe-Xinlu lines. In the future, the Wanda–Zhonghe–Shulin line and the north–south section of the Yellow line will eventually bring the number of MRT stations in Zhonghe to fifteen. The closest regular rail and high-speed services are from Banqiao station in neighbouring Banqiao District.

Road
Zhonghe has an interchange on one of Taiwan's two main north–south road arteries; the National Highway 3. Also providing road links is Provincial Highway 64, an elevated expressway that cuts through the middle of the district, with several on and off-ramps in Zhonghe itself. There are two bridges over the Xindian River; Xiulang Bridge, which connects Zhonghe with Xindian, and Huazhong Bridge, reaching Taipei's Wanhua District.

Parks and Attractions
 Jinhe Sports Park
 Dinosaur Park

Education
Zhonghe is home to the National Taiwan Library, which is located in the grounds of the 8-23 Memorial Park. It has one of the best collections in Taiwan of factual books about Taiwan in English.

There are nine elementary schools, five junior high schools, four senior high schools (2 public and 2 private high schools) in Zhonghe. The Hwa Hsia University of Technology is also located in the city.

 Zhonghe Elementary School
 Guangfu Elementary School
 Fuxing Elementary School
 Jingxin Elementary School
 Xiushan Elementary School
 Jisui Elementary School
 Ziqiang Elementary School
 Xingnan Elementary School
 Jinhe Elementary School
 Zhonghe Junior High School
 Zhanghe Junior High School
 Jisui Junior High School
 Ziqiang Junior High School
 Jinhe High School
 Jinhe High School
 Chung Ho Senior High School
 Private NanShan Senior High School
 Private Chu-Lin Senior High School

Economy
The offices of a number of technology companies are located in the district, including the Asia-Pacific head office of Viewsonic, SpotCam, a Texas Instruments research facility, the head offices of Cooler Master, and Micro-Star International.

Cultural and religious sites
 Hongludi Temple (烘爐地南山福德宮)
 Yuantong Temple (中和圓通寺)
 Xingnan Night Market (中和興南夜市)
 Fangliao Night Market

Burma Street
Zhonghe Myanmar Street or Burma Street, near Nanshijiao metro station, is home to a large proportion of Taiwan's small Burmese immigrant population. Zhonghe District is home to 40,000 Burmese Chinese (2008), making up 10% of Zhonghe's population, and constituting one of the largest communities of Burmese Chinese outside of Burma. Consequently, there are numerous stores and restaurants in this area selling Burmese produce and there are also cultural events on occasion.

Famous natives
 Lin Ching-i - Chinese Taipei women's volleyball player

International relations

Twin towns — sister cities
Zhonghe, Taiwan is twinned with:
  Los Gatos, California, United States

References

External links

  
 Government website 
 View of Zhonghe District